Holothuriidae is a family of sea cucumbers, a type of echinoderm.

Description
Members of the family Holothuriidae have thick fleshy bodies and several rows of tube feet which are used for moving around and for adhering to the surface. The body is often covered with blunt projections known as papillae. Many of the members of this family are able to eject a mass of fine sticky threads known as cuvierian tubules to distract predators, or even turn their viscera inside out.

For the taxonomic determination, the genera Actinopyga and Bohadschia have their spicules exclusively shaped like sticks, and the genera Holothuria and Labidodemas never have theirs shaped like tables. Actinopyga is also equipped with anal teeth (modified podia), and never throw out Cuvieran tubules, just like Pearsonothuria.

Members of this family occur throughout the oceans of the world at low to middle latitudes. They often live in coral reefs and nearby sandy habitat types, and a few occur in deeper waters. In the Indo-Pacific they are often dominant taxa in coral reef habitat. Most species are detritivores.

Genera
This is the second largest family of sea cucumbers with about 185 species.

Accepted genera are:
Actinopyga Bronn, 1860 – 18 species
Bohadschia Jaeger, 1833 – 12 species
Holothuria Linnaeus, 1767 – about 131 species
Labidodemas Selenka, 1867 – 8 species
Pearsonothuria Levin in Levin, Kalinin & Stonik, 1984 – 1 species

References

 
Echinoderm families
Taxa named by Hermann Burmeister